Socorro Alicia Rastrollo Quirino (born August 11, 1953), professionally known as Cory Quirino, is a Filipino television host, author and beauty pageant titleholder. She is currently the president and national director of Mutya ng Pilipinas. She is also a former licensee and national director of Miss World Philippines and Mister World Philippines. She is also a council member of one of the branch offices of the Philippine Red Cross. She is also the president of the Volunteers Against Crime and Corruption (VACC) from February 2018, replacing Dante Jimenez who was appointed as the head of the newly-formed Presidential Anti-Corruption Commission.

Early life
Quirino is the third child of Tomas Quirino/Tomas "Tommy" Quirino and Conchita Rastrollo. She is also the granddaughter of Philippine president Elpidio Quirino. She is married to Ramon Cruz, Jr.

Education
Quirino completed her primary education at the College of the Holy Spirit Manila near Malacañan Palace, and completed her secondary education at Assumption College San Lorenzo. She spent a few years at Maryknoll (now Miriam College) taking A.B. classes before she went to Spain to complete her Fine Arts degree. Quirino took up her master's degree in hotel and restaurant management at Philippine Women's University.

Career
Quirino began her broadcasting career in the 1980s when she hosted the late-night talk show Oh No, It's Johnny! for the Philippine TV network RPN (Radio Philippines Network). Eventually, she hosted her own show Citiline, a weekly travel and fitness show that aired on Studio 23 (now ABS-CBN Sports+Action), a subsidiary of ABS-CBN Corporation.

During an out-of-town shoot for Citiline, Cory Quirino and her entourage were abducted by bandits. This incident was chronicled in her book Waiting for the Light as well as the movie The Cory Quirino Kidnap: NBI Files, which starred award-winning actors, Ara Mina and Alessandra de Rossi. Citiline was eventually re-titled as The Good Life with Cory Quirino.

Aside from Waiting for the Light, Cory Quirino wrote a series of best-seller books titled Forever Young, which feature beauty and health tips as well as her own workout programs.

She also made a fitness video titled Cory Quirino’s Celebrity Workout for Beginners.

Quirino hosts the Sunday morning television program The Good Life with Cory Quirino and the radio show Ma-Beauty Po Naman. She writes a weekly health and fitness column, Inside Out, for the Philippine Daily Inquirer's newspaper and website.

She maintains a store called Cory Quirino World of Wellness in Greenhills Shopping Center, located in San Juan, Metro Manila. She was inducted as a Celebrity Inductee at the Eastwood City Walk Of Fame Philippines 2014 for contributing her hosting job on TV & also endorsing.

Charity work
Quirino is currently a member of the board of trustees and overall chair of "Alay sa PGH" fund-drive of the Philippine General Hospital Medical Foundation As national director for Miss World in the Philippines, she intends to do more charity work.

On April 17, 2013, she was also elected and inducted as one of the new council members of the Philippine Red Cross - Rizal Chapter - Muntinlupa Branch. She has committed her full support in helping raise more funds for the various humanitarian activities of the Philippine Red Cross.

Credits

Television shows
Oh No, It's Johnny!
IBC News 11 O'Clock Report (1992–1994) - Anchors
Citiline (1994–1999) Aired on ABS-CBN, (1999–2003) Aired on Studio 23, and (2003–2006) Aired on ABS-CBN Tacloban
The Cory Quirino Show (2003)
The Good Life with Cory Quirino (2005–present)
Celebrity Duets Season 2 (2008) - Contestant
Organique TV (2015–present) Aired on Light Network

Print
Waiting For The Light
Forever Young: Cory Quirino's Guide to Beauty & Fitness
Forever Young: Cory Quirino's Guide to Beauty and Wellness
My ABCs of Beauty and Wellness
Inside Out
Kabataan Habambuhay: Ang Gabay ni Cory Quirino tungo sa Kagandahan at Kalusugan

Radio
Ma-Beauty Po Naman (2004–2020)

Movies
The Cory Quirino Kidnap: NBI Files (2003)

Video
Cory Quirino's Celebrity Workout for Beginners (1998)

See also
List of kidnappings

References

External links

1953 births
Formerly missing people
Kidnapped businesspeople
Kidnapped Filipino people
Living people
Missing person cases in the Philippines
Participants in Philippine reality television series
Philippine Women's University alumni
Cory